Giuliana Olmos and Laura Pigossi were the defending champions, but both players chose not to participate.

Jessika Ponchet and Eden Silva won the title, defeating Jodie Anna Burrage and Olivia Nicholls in the final, 6–3, 6–4.

Seeds

Draw

Draw

References
Main Draw

Torneig Internacional Els Gorchs - Doubles